Capital League 2 is the third tier of men's senior football (soccer) in Brisbane, (6th tier Queensland and Level 7 within Australia). It is administered by Football Brisbane. All clubs participating in Capital League 2 must field two teams, one in first grade, and another in the reserves competition. Clubs in the NPL and Brisbane Premier League cannot field their reserves teams in this division.

History
Prior to World War 2, the Brisbane soccer competition irregularly operating a third division when team numbers required it. After the war, the 1947 season was the first to require three divisions. Six teams participated in the 1947 Division 3 competition: Kookaburra (the eventual champions), YMCA reserves, Junction Rangers, Judeans, Caledonians and Merton Rovers reserves.

The third tier of Brisbane soccer continued to be known as Division 3 from 1947 to 1982, with reserve teams from the two top divisions continuing to participate alongside first grade teams of other clubs until the early 1970s. When the Brisbane Premier League was formed in 1983, the Tier 3 league became Division 2. An intermediate league existed at Tier 2 between 1984 and 1986 and the third tier became Amateur Division 1. From 1987 to 1996, Tier 3 was again known as Division 3 before reverting to Amateur Division 1 again between 1997 and 2001, then Division 2 for the 2002 season. Despite all these changes in divisional name, the division's format remained consistently a 12 team competition from 1977 to 2001.

From 2003 to 2012, the third tier of Brisbane football was known as Premier Division 2, which operated below the Brisbane Premier League and Premier Division 1. It functioned as a 12 team competition from 2003 to 2010, expanded to 14 teams for season 2011 only, then reverted to 12 teams again in 2012.

Since being rebranded Capital League 2 in 2013 following a restructure of Football Brisbane competitions, this division has continued in its 12 team format, with 22 rounds of matches played in the regular season to decide the premiers, followed by a finals series involving the top four teams to determine the champions.

Format
The regular season consists of 22 rounds with teams playing each other twice in a home and away format.

Following the regular season the top four teams on the table play in a finals series using the following format:
 First Week: Semi Final 1 – 3rd vs 4th; Semi Final 2 – 1st vs 2nd
 Second Week: Preliminary Final – Loser Semi 2 vs Winner Semi 1
 Final Week: Grand Final – Winner Semi 2 vs Winner Preliminary.

Promotion/relegation
At the end of the regular season the top two teams are promoted to Capital League 1 and the bottom two teams are relegated to Capital League 3. There is a finals series at the end of the regular season.

Clubs

The clubs for the 2020 season are shown in the table below:

References

External links
 Football Brisbane
 SportsTG Fixtures & Results

Soccer leagues in Queensland